() is a district of Shanghai. The district government is located at 1320 Yuyuan Rd. Zhongshan Park is located in the district.

Economy
Shanghai Hongqiao International Airport is located in Changning. China Eastern Airlines has its headquarters, the China Eastern Airlines Building, on the airport grounds. China Cargo Airlines has its headquarters on the airport property. Spring Airlines has its headquarters in the Homeyo Hotel in Changning. Juneyao Airlines has its headquarters in the district.

Huazhu Hotels or China Lodging, which operates Hanting Hotels and other brands, has its headquarters in the district. Additionally Pinduoduo is based in the district.

Renren Inc. has its Shanghai office in the SOHO Zhong Shan Square in Changning District.

Parks and recreation
The Shanghai Zoo is located in the district. New Town Central Park opened in 2000.

Subdistricts and town

Education
East China University of Political Science and Law has a Changning Campus.

Schools in Changning District include Shanghai Yan'an High School, a school well known for its mathematics program; Shanghai New Hongqiao High School, a private school; Yew Wah School of Shanghai; the Primary Division of the bilingual YK Pao School; and Shanghai Meizhi Mandarin School.

Transportation

Metro
Changning is currently served by five metro lines operated by Shanghai Metro:
 - Songhong Road, Beixinjing, Weining Road, Loushanguan Road, Zhongshan Park , Jiangsu Road 
 and  - Hongqiao Road, West Yan'an Road, Zhongshan Park 
 - Shanghai Zoo, Longxi Road, Shuicheng Road, Yili Road, Songyuan Road
 - Jiaotong University , Jiangsu Road

References

Further reading

External links

 Official website of Changning District
 Official website of Changning District 

 
Districts of Shanghai